Naamah Kelman-Ezrachi (first name also spelled in English as Naama; born January 25, 1955) is an American-born Rabbi who was named as Dean of the Hebrew Union College-Jewish Institute of Religion campus in Jerusalem starting in July 2009. In 1992, Kelman made history as the first woman in Israel to become a rabbi when she received her rabbinic ordination from Rabbi Alfred Gottschalk.

Personal
Kelman was born in New York City, the daughter of Rabbi Wolfe Kelman, a leader in the Conservative Judaism movement who had served nearly four decades as executive vice president of its Rabbinical Assembly, where he led efforts to professionalize the rabbinate and to prepare the steps for the ordination of women in the Conservative movement. The descendant of rabbis on both sides of her family, her paternal grandfather was a rabbi and community leader in Toronto who descended from a multi-generational line of Hasidic rabbis from Poland. Her maternal grandfather, Rabbi Felix A. Levy, also received his ordination from HUC and helped pass the Columbus Platform of 1937 that undid many of the anti-Zionist aspects of the 1885 Pittsburgh Platform. Her brother, Levi Weiman Kelman, also a rabbi, leads a congregation in Jerusalem.

As a student at the University of Pennsylvania, she graduated with a Bachelor of Arts degree. After moving to Israel in 1976, she earned a Master of Arts degree in Social Work from the Institute of Contemporary Jewry at Hebrew University of Jerusalem. , Kelman was pursuing a Ph.D. at Bar-Ilan University in Ramat Gan, with a focus on "The Construction of Meaning for Young Israelis: Examining Non-Orthodox Weddings."

Her husband, Dr. Elan Ezrachi, is a former Israeli Air Force pilot, who specializes in Israeli relations with Jewish communities in the Diaspora. They had two daughters, Leora and Daphna, a son, Mikey, and 4 grandchildren, as of 2017. Leora (full name Leora Ezrachi-Vered) was ordained by the Hebrew Union College-Jewish Institute of Religion campus in Jerusalem, as the 100th Israeli Reform rabbi, in 2017.

Career
On July 23, 1992, HUC President Rabbi Alfred Gottschalk oversaw Kelman's "historic and symbolic" ordination at the school's Jerusalem campus as Israel's first woman rabbi. Hebrew Union College named her to serve as the first female Dean of the HUC campus in Jerusalem effective July 1, 2009, when she succeeded Dr. Michael Marmur. She wrote the piece "Personal Reflection: A First Rabbi, from a Long Line of Rabbis", which appears in the book The Sacred Calling: Four Decades of Women in the Rabbinate, published in 2016.

Other
The art exhibit “Holy Sparks”, which opened in February 2022 at the Heller Museum and the Skirball Museum, featured 24 Jewish women artists, who had each created an artwork about a female rabbi who was a first in some way. Ellen Alt created the artwork about Kelman.

References

1955 births
American emigrants to Israel
Bar-Ilan University alumni
Paul Baerwald School of Social Work and Social Welfare alumni
Israeli Reform rabbis
Rabbis from New York City
American Reform rabbis
University of Pennsylvania alumni
Hebrew Union College – Jewish Institute of Religion faculty
Reform women rabbis
Living people
Women deans (academic)
American academic administrators
Israeli academic administrators
20th-century American rabbis
21st-century American rabbis